The Battle of Sigüenza took place from  7 August 1936 to 15 October 1936 during the Spanish Civil War.

References

Sigüenza
Siguenza
1936 in Spain
Siguenza
Sigüenza
History of the province of Guadalajara